There are four type of libraries in Turkey.
National Library
Public Libraries
School libraries
University libraries
In 2017 the Turkish Statistical Institute published the data about the libraries in Turkey (as of 31.12.2016)

References

 
Turkish culture
Public libraries